CDB Deporte y Amistad, more known as Fundación Adepal Alcázar, is a professional basketball team based in Alcázar de San Juan, Castilla La Mancha. The team played in league LEB Oro during the 2010–11 season. After that season, the club was dissolved.

Season by season

Trophies and awards

Trophies
LEB Plata: (1)
2010

External links
Official website

Defunct basketball teams in Spain
Former LEB Oro teams
Basketball teams in Castilla–La Mancha
Basketball teams established in 2006
Basketball teams disestablished in 2011
Alcázar de San Juan